The Mill and the Cross is a 2011 drama film directed by Lech Majewski and starring Rutger Hauer, Charlotte Rampling, and Michael York. It is inspired by Pieter Bruegel the Elder's 1564 painting The Procession to Calvary, and based on Michael Francis Gibson's 1996 book The Mill and the Cross. The film was a Polish-Swedish co-production. Filming on the project wrapped in August 2009. It premiered at the Sundance Film Festival on January 23, 2011.

Plot
The film focuses on a dozen of the 500 characters depicted in Bruegel's painting. It consists of a series of vignettes depicting everyday peasant life, interspersed with monologues from some of the principal characters, including Bruegel explaining the structure and symbolism of his painting. The theme of Christ's suffering is set against religious persecution in Flanders in 1564.

Cast
 Rutger Hauer as Pieter Bruegel
 Michael York as Nicolaes Jonghelinck
 Charlotte Rampling as Mary
 Joanna Litwin as Marijken Bruegel (Pieter's wife)
 Marian Makula as The Miller

Reception
, The Mill and the Cross holds a 79% approval rating on review aggregator Rotten Tomatoes, based on 42 reviews with an average rating of 7.41/10. Metacritic, which uses a weighted average, assigned a score of 80 out of 100, based on 17 critics, indicating "generally favorable reviews".

Roger Ebert from the Chicago Sun-Times gave the film 4 stars out of four and stated: "If you see no more than the opening shots, you will never forget them. It opens on a famous painting, and within the painting, a few figures move and walk. We will meet some of those people in more detail." Joe Bendel: "... one of the standouts at this year’s Sundance". Varietys Dennis Harvey wrote: "While hardly an exercise in strict realism a la The Girl With the Pearl Earring, the pic details rustic Flanders life with loving care, from costuming to simple machinery. Pic's narrative content ... is hardly straightforward or propulsive. ... the film is never dull, and frequently entrancing." Harvey thought that if marketed cleverly, the film "could prove the Polish helmer's belated international breakthrough". Neil Young of The Hollywood Reporter complimented the technical achievements, but called the film "ambitious but frustratingly flat". He described the English dialogue as "mostly clunky" and thought the film "has too much of a stodgy Euro-pudding feel". On the other hand, in his review for the San Francisco International Film Festival, executive director Graham Leggat wrote: "...the narrative is not the point—the extraordinary imagery is. The painting literally comes to life in this spellbinding film, its wondrous scenes entering the viewer like a dream enters a sleeping body."

References

External links
 
 
 

Video interview of Lech Majewski by Gherardo Vitali Rosati
The Mill and the Cross - review
The Mill and the Cross. The Film as Theoretical Object

2011 films
2010s English-language films
English-language Polish films
English-language Swedish films
Films directed by Lech Majewski
Films shot in Poland
Belgium in fiction
Films set in Flanders
Films set in the 1560s
Biographical films about painters
Polish biographical films
Swedish biographical films
Pieter Bruegel the Elder
Works based on art
2010s biographical films
2010s Swedish films